Montbenoît is a commune in the Doubs department in the Bourgogne-Franche-Comté region in eastern France.

Geography

History
In the early 12th century, Landry, Lord of Joux, gave land in the upper Doubs valley to Humbert, Archbishop of Besançon, to found an abbey. The local summit in the area was at the time called Mont Benoît after a hermit named Benoît who lived there.  Humbert invited monks to come from Valais and an abbey under St. Columbanus's rule was built by a monk called Nardouin (Norduin) in 1141–1142. The town grew up nearby the abbey. Both the abbey and the town were named Montbenoît after the local summit.  The abbey later came under the Augustine rule.

In 1947, Montbenoît was proclaimed capital of the Republic of Saugeais by Georges Pourchet, a local hotel owner, who also created the republic on the spot.

Population

See also
 Communes of the Doubs department

References

External links

 Montbenoît on the intercommunal Web site of the department 

Communes of Doubs